The javelin throw is a track and field event where the javelin, a spear about  in length, is thrown. The javelin thrower gains momentum by running within a predetermined area. Javelin throwing is an event of both the men's decathlon and the women's heptathlon.

History

The javelin throw was added to the Ancient Olympic Games as part of the pentathlon in 708 BC. It included two events, one for distance and the other for accuracy in hitting a target.  The javelin was thrown with the aid of a thong (ankyle in Greek) that was wound around the middle of the shaft. Athletes held the javelin by the ankyle, and when they released the shaft, the unwinding of the thong gave the javelin a spiral trajectory.

Throwing javelin-like poles into targets was revived in Germany and Sweden in the early 1870s. In Sweden, these poles developed into the modern javelin, and throwing them for distance became a common event there and in Finland in the 1880s. The rules continued to evolve over the next decades; originally, javelins were thrown with no run-up, and holding them by the grip at the center of gravity was not always mandatory. Limited run-ups were introduced in the late 1890s, and soon developed into the modern unlimited run-up.

Sweden's Eric Lemming, who threw his first world best (49.32 meters) in 1899 and ruled the event from 1902 to 1912, was the first dominant javelin thrower. When the men's javelin was introduced as an Olympic discipline at the 1906 Intercalated Games, Lemming won by almost nine metres and broke his own world record; Sweden swept the first four places, as Finland's best throwers were absent and the event had yet to become popular in any other country. Though challenged by younger talents, Lemming repeated as Olympic champion in 1908 and 1912; his eventual best mark (62.32 m, thrown after the 1912 Olympics) was the first javelin world record to be officially ratified by the International Association of Athletics Federations.

In the late 19th and early 20th century, most javelin competitions were two-handed; the implement was thrown with the right hand and separately with the left hand, and the best marks for each hand were added together. Competitions for the better hand only were less common, though not unknown. At the Olympics, a both-hands contest was held only once, in 1912; Finland swept the medals, ahead of Lemming. After that, this version of the javelin rapidly faded into obscurity, together with similar variations of the shot and the discus; Sweden's Yngve Häckner, with his total of 114.28 m from 1917, was the last official both-hands world record holder.

Another early variant was the freestyle javelin, in which holding the javelin by the grip at the center of gravity was not mandatory; such a freestyle competition was held at the 1908 Olympics, but was dropped from the program after that. Hungary's Mór Kóczán used a freestyle end grip to break the 60-meter barrier in 1911, a year before Lemming and Julius Saaristo first did so with a regular grip.

The first known women's javelin marks were recorded in Finland in 1909. Originally, women threw the same implement as men; a lighter, shorter javelin for women was introduced in the 1920s. Women's javelin throw was added to the Olympic program in 1932; Mildred "Babe" Didrikson of the United States became the first champion.

For a long time, javelins were made of solid wood, typically birch, with a steel tip. The hollow, highly aerodynamic Held javelin, invented by American thrower Bud Held and developed and manufactured by his brother Dick, was introduced in the 1950s; the first Held javelins were also wooden with steel tips, but later models were made entirely of metal. These new javelins flew further, but were also less likely to land neatly point first; as a response to the increasingly frequent flat or ambiguously flat landings, experiments with modified javelins started in the early 1980s. The resulting designs, which made flat landings much less common and reduced the distances thrown, became official for men starting in April 1986 and for women in April 1999, and the world records (then 104.80 m by Uwe Hohn, and 80.00 m by Petra Felke) were reset. The current men's world record is held by Jan Železný at 98.48 m (1996); Barbora Špotáková holds the women's world record at 72.28 m (2008).

Of the 69 Olympic medals that have been awarded in the men's javelin, 32 have gone to competitors from Norway, Sweden or Finland. Finland is the only nation to have swept the medals at a currently recognized official Olympics, and has done so twice, in 1920 and 1932, in addition to its 1912 sweep in the two-handed javelin; in 1920 Finland swept the first four places, which is no longer possible as only three entrants per country are allowed. Finland has, however, never been nearly as successful in the women's javelin.

The javelin throw has been part of the decathlon since the decathlon was introduced in the early 1910s; the all-around, an earlier ten-event contest of American origin, did not include the javelin throw. The javelin was also part of some (though not all) of the many early forms of women's pentathlon and has always been included in the heptathlon after it replaced the pentathlon in 1981.

Rules and competitions

The size, shape, minimum weight, and center of gravity of the javelin are all defined by World Athletics rules.

Unlike the other throwing events (shot put, discus, and hammer), the technique used to throw the javelin is dictated by IAAF rules and "non-orthodox" techniques are not permitted. The javelin must be held at its grip and thrown overhand, over the athlete's shoulder or upper arm. Further, the athlete is prohibited from turning completely around or starting with their back facing the direction of the throw. This prevents athletes from attempting to spin and hurl the javelin sidearm in the style of a discus throw.  This rule was put in place when a group of athletes began experimenting with a spin technique referred to as "free style".  On 24 October 1956, Pentti Saarikoski threw  using the technique holding the end of the javelin.  Officials were so afraid of the out of control nature of the technique that the practice was banned through these rule specifications.

Like the other throwing events, the competitor may not leave the throwing area (the runway) until after the implement lands. The need to come to a stop behind the throwing arc limits both how close the athlete can come to the line before the release as well as the maximum speed achieved at the time of release.

The javelin is thrown towards a 28.96º circular sector that is centered on the center point of the throwing arc. The angle of the throwing sector (28.96º) provides sector boundaries that are easy to construct and lay out on a field. A throw is only legal if the tip of the javelin lands within this sector and first strikes the ground with its tip before any other part. The distance of the throw is measured from the throwing arc to the point where the tip of the javelin landed, rounded down to the nearest centimeter.

Competition rules are similar to other throwing events: a round consists of one attempt by each competitor in turn, and competitions typically consist of three to six rounds. The competitor with the longest single legal throw (over all rounds) is the winner; in case of a tie, the competitors' second-longest throws are also considered. Competitions involving large numbers of athletes sometimes use a cut whereby all competitors compete in the first three rounds but only those who are currently among the top eight or have achieved some minimum distances are permitted to attempt to improve on their distance in additional rounds (typically three).

Javelin redesigns

On 1 April 1986, the men's javelin was redesigned by the governing body (the IAAF Technical Committee). They decided to change the rules for javelin design because of the increasingly frequent flat landings and the resulting discussions and protests when these attempts were declared valid or invalid by competition judges. The world record had also crept up to a potentially dangerous level,  by Uwe Hohn. With throws exceeding 100 meters, it was becoming difficult to safely stage the competition within the confines of a stadium infield. The javelin was redesigned so that the centre of gravity was moved  forward. In addition, the surface area in front of centre of gravity was reduced, while the surface area behind the centre of gravity was increased. This had an effect similar to that produced by the feathers on an arrow. The javelin turns into the relative wind. This relative wind appears to originate from the ground as the javelin descends, thus the javelin turns to face the ground. As the javelin turns into the wind less lift is generated, reducing the flight distance by around 10% but also causing the javelin to stick in the ground more consistently. In 1999, the women's javelin was similarly redesigned.

Modifications that manufacturers made to recover some of the lost distance, by increasing tail drag (using holes, rough paint or dimples), were forbidden at the end of 1991 and marks made using implements with such modifications removed from the record books.

Weight rules by age group
The weight of the javelin in the Under-20 category is the same as the senior level.

Technique and training
Unlike other throwing events, javelin allows the competitor to build speed over a considerable distance. In addition, the core and upper body strength is necessary to deliver the implement, javelin throwers benefit from the agility and athleticism typically associated with running and jumping events. Thus, the athletes share more physical characteristics with sprinters than with others, although they still need the skill of heavier throwing athletes.

Traditional free-weight training is often used by javelin throwers. Metal-rod exercises and resistance band exercises can be used to train a similar action to the javelin throw to increase power and intensity. Without proper strength and flexibility, throwers can become extremely injury prone, especially in the shoulder and elbow. Core stability can help in the transference of physical power and force from the ground through the body to the javelin. Stretching and sprint training are used to enhance the speed of the athlete at the point of release, and subsequently, the speed of the javelin. At release, a javelin can reach speeds approaching 113 km/h (70 mph).

The javelin throw consists of three separate phases: the run-up, the transition, and the delivery.  During each phase, the position of the javelin changes while the thrower changes his or her muscle recruitment.  In the run-up phase as Luann Voza states, "your arm is bent and kept close to your head, keeping the javelin in alignment with little to no arm movement". This allows the thrower's bicep to contract, flexing the elbow.  In order for the javelin to stay up high, the thrower's deltoid flexes.  In the transition phase, the thrower's  "back muscles contract" as "the javelin is brought back in alignment with the shoulder with the thrower's palm up". This, according to Voza, "stretches your pectoral, or chest, muscles. From there, a stretch reflex, an involuntary contraction of your chest, helps bring your throwing arm forward with increased force". During the final phase, the rotation of the shoulders initiates the release, which then "transfers movement through the triceps muscles, wrists and fingers to extend the throwing arm forward to release the javelin".

US high school and youth competitions
Due to the fear of liability, the javelin throw is an event in NFHS high school competition in only 22 states, although that number could continue to rise. Those states are:

Regardless of the state, USATF youth competitions for the same aged athletes do hold javelin competitions. At various points in time, high schools have attempted to create substitute events, including the softball throw, football throw and the grenade throw, throwing different objects under rules similar to javelin throw rules. In those states that do allow high school javelin competition, a few specify that the tip must be of rubber. Further, in age group track meets in the U.S., and in particular with elementary-school children in the Northeast, the Turbojav—a smaller plastic implement with a rubber tip but with similar flying characteristics as a real javelin—is a popular alternative.

Culture

In 1994, Michael Torke composed Javelin, commissioned by the Atlanta Committee for the Olympic Games in celebration of the Atlanta Symphony Orchestra's 50th anniversary season, in conjunction with the 1996 Summer Olympics.

Javelin throwers have been selected as a main motif in numerous collectors' coins.  One of the recent samples is the €5 Finnish 10th IAAF World Championships in Athletics commemorative coin, minted in 2005 to commemorate the 2005 World Championships in Athletics. On the obverse of the coin, a javelin thrower is depicted. On the reverse, legs of hurdle runners with the Helsinki Olympic Stadium tower in the background can be seen.

All-time top 25 (current models)

Men
Correct as of August 2022.

Women
Correct as of May 2022.

Annulled marks
In 2011, Mariya Abakumova threw 71.99 metres. This performance was annulled due to doping offences.

All-time top 5 (dimpled models 1990–1991)

Marks set using dimpled rough-tailed javelins manufactured by several companies were nullified effective 20 September 1991.

All-time top 15 (old models)

Men

Women

Olympic medalists

Men

Women

World Championships medalists

Men

Women

Season's bests

Men

A new model was introduced in 1986, and all records started fresh.

Women

A new model was introduced in 1999 and all records started fresh.

See also

 List of javelin throw national champions (men)

 List of javelin throwers

References

External links

IAAF list of javelin-throw records in XML
(IAAF Statement)  – statement of reasons to modify the javelin design
Masters World Rankings 
IAAF competition rules

 
Events in track and field
Ancient Olympic sports
Throwing sports
Summer Olympic disciplines in athletics